VA-147 has a number of meanings:

 VFA-147 Argonauts (formerly VA-147), a US Navy attack aircraft squadron
 Virginia State Route 147